McKinlay is a surname. Notable people with the surname include:

 Adam McKinlay (1887–1950), member of the British House of Commons for a number of Scottish constituencies
 Billy McKinlay (born 1969), former Scottish footballer, Reserve Team Manager of Fulham in London, England
 Bob McKinlay (1932–2002), Scottish footballer who played for Nottingham Forest
 Donald McKinlay (1891–1959), Scottish footballer (defender) 
 Duncan E. McKinlay (1862–1914), U.S. Representative from California
 John McKinlay (1819–1872), explorer of Australia
 Ken McKinlay (1928–2003), international speedway rider
 Tosh McKinlay (born 1964), Scottish former international footballer

See also
McKinley
MacKinlay
McKinlay, Queensland, town in Australia
McKinlay Shire, local government area in Australia